Soulitary is the debut studio album of South African singer-songwriter and record producer Zonke. The album was released in December 2006 in Germany, Japan and Italy.

Track listing
 "Listen"
 "Betta Days"
 "Wena Wedna"
 "Groove Train"  D M' Baye)
 "I Wanna Thank You"
 "Someday"
 "Only You"
 "Soulitary"
 "It's Love"
 "Phaphama"
 "How Long"
 "Across 110th Street"
 "Take Me There"
 "Ngena"
 "Walk On"  (D M' Baye)
 "How Can I Say"
 "Music"
 "Someday (Remix)" (Bonus)

Release history

References

2006 debut albums
Zonke albums